My Fighting Gentleman (also known as A Son of Battle) is a 1917 American silent historical drama film directed by Edward Sloman with the storyline by Doris Schroeder and Nell Shipman. The film stars William Russell and Francelia Billington.

Cast
William Russell as Frank Carlisle
Francelia Billington as Virginia Leighton
Charles Newton as Colonel Carlisle
Jack Vosburgh as Huntly Thornton
Clarence Burton as Isiah Gore
Harry von Meter as Judge Pembroke
William Carroll as Jubilee
Sid Algier as Jim
Lucille Ward as Undetermined Role

External links

1917 films
American silent feature films
American black-and-white films
Films directed by Edward Sloman
American historical drama films
1910s historical drama films
1917 drama films
1910s American films
Silent American drama films